John III of Saxe-Lauenburg (mid 1330s – 1356) was the eldest son of Duke Albert IV of Saxe-Lauenburg and Beata of Schwerin (*?–before 1341*), daughter of Gunzelin VI, Count of Schwerin. John III succeeded his father in 1343 as Duke of Saxe-Bergedorf-Mölln, a branch duchy of Saxe-Lauenburg. He died without an heir and was succeeded by his younger brother Albert V.

Ancestry

 

|-

1356 deaths
John 03
John 03
Year of birth unknown